Jiangxi province was a province of the Yuan dynasty established in 1277. It included modern Jiangxi, and most of Guangdong. The capital was Longxing (now called Nanchang).

See also
 Administrative divisions of the Yuan dynasty

References

Provinces of the Yuan dynasty
1277 establishments
History of Jiangxi
History of Guangdong